Walden Alexis Vargas is a Colombian football player who currently plays for Atlético Huila in Categoría Primera A.

External links
 BDFA profile

1984 births
Living people
Colombian footballers
Deportivo Pasto footballers
Atlético Huila footballers
People from Barbacoas, Nariño
Association football defenders
Sportspeople from Nariño Department